Manson Sherrill (Manse) Jolly (died 1869) was the fifth son of Joseph Moorhead Jolly and Anna Cole Sherrill. He had six brothers and four sisters, one of whom died in infancy. Jolly was known for his brutal revenge against the Union soldiers stationed in Anderson, South Carolina after the close of the Civil War.

Jolly's furlough papers describe him at 20 years of age as "six feet four inches high, ruddy complexion, blue eyes, red hair, and by profession a farmer, born in Anderson district in the state of S.C."

Five of Jolly's brothers were killed during the war, and the sixth committed suicide, possibly from the effects of the war. Upon returning home to find his town taken over by the men he had been fighting, Jolly swore an oath to kill five "Yankee" soldiers for every brother he lost during the war. Jolly more than made good on his oath. He reportedly hid out in the forests surrounding Anderson, and preyed upon the Union soldiers stationed nearby. Jolly used guerrilla warfare tactics, with which he would have been familiar from his experience as a scout during the American Civil War. When staying in Anderson became too dangerous for him, Jolly fled to Cameron, Texas, to his Sherrill relatives in 1867, where he died by drowning two years later while attempting to cross a swollen stream.

References 

1869 deaths
American folklore
American murderers
American serial killers
Confederate States Army soldiers
Deaths by drowning in the United States
Male serial killers
People from Anderson, South Carolina
People from Cameron, Texas
People of South Carolina in the American Civil War